Very Up & Co (= Uscha Pohl and Company) is a contemporary art gallery in New York City and London that describes itself as covering "art, fashion and design" and stages exhibitions, art and fashion events in London, New York City and Paris.

It was founded in 1996 in TriBeCa, Lower Manhattan, New York, by entrepreneur, artist and art collector and German expat Uscha Pohl, who is the present director and curator.

In September 1997, Very Up & Co launched the international art magazine Very, which is published twice a year.

In 2004, the gallery opened its branch in London.

Exhibited artists include Damien Hirst, Tracey Emin, Cees Krijnen, Juan Manuel Echavarria, Lara Schnitger, Judith Eisler, Devon Dikeou

References

Sources
 Tom Moody, Op at Up, Up & Co, NY, May 16-July 18, 1998
 Artnet, with Uscha Pohl‘s Changing Room-ID Cell, 1999
 Die Zeit online, It and Out, New Yorker Notizen, 1999
 MoMa PS1, Criss Cross: SomeYoung New Yorkers !II February 7-April 3, 1999
 Bomb – Artists in Conversation, Juan Manuel Echavarria, Winter 2000
 The Fashion Spot, Uscha Pohl-Editor, Very, June 2003
 Frieze, Cees Krijnen, June-August 2004
 Uscha Pohl on Turning Green, Blog, December 12, 2012
 Pool life & culture, nr. 28, Green on the city
 Zingmagazine, issue 4, Uscha Pohl and Ellen Cantor
 Michelle Lowe-Holder, Uscha Pohl and VERY, November 9, 2011
 EctFashionBlog, After Faux Fur_Fur Is Imaginary Talk, February 28, 2013

External links
 Very magazine website

Art museums and galleries in Manhattan
Contemporary art galleries in the United States
Contemporary art galleries in London